A knife attack near Munich took place on 10 May 2016 when a 27-year-old mentally disturbed man stabbed four men, one of them fatally at Grafing station in the Upper Bavarian town of Grafing, some  from Munich, southern Germany. As the knifer reportedly shouted "Allahu Akbar" while stabbing the random victims, first reactions of the German and international media as well as the general public suspected an Islamist attack. On his arrest shortly after the attack, the perpetrator proved to be a mentally disturbed, unemployed carpenter with drug problems and no known ties to Islamist organizations. In August 2017 the Landgericht München II ruled the man to not be criminally liable of the crime and committed him to a closed psychiatric ward.

The attack
The attack occurred during the morning hours of 10 May 2016 at Grafing station in the town of Grafing in the Munich Metropolitan Region. A 56-year-old man was attacked by the perpetrator with a  knife on board a Munich S-Bahn train; he later died in hospital. A further man was then attacked on the platform, then the knifer targeted two cyclists in front of the station, one of them a local newspaper deliveryman of 58 years who was seriously injured in the attack. According to eyewitnesses and confirmed by investigators, the perpetrator shouted "Allahu Akbar" ("God is great" in Arabic) and, in German, "Infidel, you must die now" during the attack. All victims were randomly chosen. The train driver and a security official were reported to have chased the man away from the station. Police officers responded at the crime scene on 5:04 a.m. and arrested a suspect only minutes later in front of the station.

Perpetrator
Initially, the attacker was suspected to be a Kurdish Islamist with ties to Ansar al-Islam, although 
the attacker was later described as a mentally disturbed, 27-year-old unemployed carpenter with no known ties to Islamist organizations. Local media outlets dubbed him as "Paul H."  The perpetrator was admitted to a psychiatric hospital after the attack, reported the Bremen daily Weser-Kurier.

He was arrested in the hours following the attack. Though it was first reported that he had a migrant background, later reports indicated that he was from the German state of Hesse, and "does not have a migrant background".

Aftermath

Investigation
A spokesperson at the Bavarian state criminal investigation office stated that she could not confirm that the attack was related to terrorism. The police said that the attack was done with "political motive," based on "made statements". Ken Heidenreich, spokesperson of the prosecutor's office, said on the morning of 10 May that an "Islamistic background" was likely.

Later that day, it was reported that the perpetrator had drug and mental problems and was treated two days earlier. The assumption that the attacker was an Islamist was ruled out, but a political motive is still being considered, though the attacker appeared to be confused during the interrogation. The perpetrator was not cooperating during first interrogation, but he later admitted to committing the attack. No links to terrorist networks were known. The police established a special commission, consisting of 80 officers. The perpetrator's cell phone and tablet computer were found and evaluated; in addition, CCTV recordings from the train and station were investigated.

Security measures
Service at the train station was temporarily closed to allow authorities to conduct their investigation.

The attack caused the New York City Police Department to temporarily increase security on the New York City Subway system while investigators looked into possible connections to international militant organizations.

Discussions made in the wake of the attack raised the possibility that bag checks at German train stations might have found the knife used in the attack and prevented it from happening, but German public opinion believes that such searches are an invasion of privacy.

Mental illness discussion
The attack was cited as one of a number of incidents in which mentally disturbed individuals launched violent attacks under the justification of Islamist ideas or slogans. Other examples include Man Haron Monis, the gunman in the 2014 Sydney hostage crisis; and Michael Zehaf-Bibeau, the perpetrator of the 2014 shootings at Parliament Hill, Ottawa. According to psychologists and psychiatrists who study radicalization, jihad propaganda and calls to kill infidels can push mentally disturbed individuals to act, even in the absence of direct or personal contact with radical Islamists.

Other reactions
German Minister of the Interior Thomas de Maizière condemned the attack as "cowardly and outrageous" on the day of the assault.

A conspiracy theory, which began in Italy before spreading to Germany and then to the English-speaking world, purported that Paul H. was actually named Rafik Youssef and that his name had been changed as part of a cover-up. Rafik Yousef was an Islamist in Berlin who was shot dead by police in September 2015.

The attack was compared to a knife attack at Hanover main station earlier that year on 26 February. The Italian newspaper La Repubblica compared this attack to the 2016 Wurzburg train attack, as did the BBC.

Journalist Nabila Ramdani expressed outrage at what she termed the "purposeful" and "grossly manipulative" media use of the phrase Allahu Akbar, which, she claims, has become, a "trigger for publicity: the perfect tool for those seeking to spread as much discord as possible".

Verdict
On 17 August 2017, the Landgericht München II deemed the accused not criminally liable for his actions in Grafing. His mental illness, testified to by a psychiatrist in court, was acknowledged not only by the judge, but also by the prosecution as well as the accessory prosecution of several victims. He was then sentenced to stay in a closed psychiatric ward for an undetermined time.

See also
Islamic terrorism in Europe

References

2016 crimes in Germany
2016 in Bavaria
2010s in Munich
Crime in Bavaria
Ebersberg (district)
Knife attacks
Mass stabbings in Germany
May 2016 crimes in Europe
May 2016 events in Germany
Stabbing attacks in 2016